Iván Lorenzo Roncero (born 15 April 1986) is an Andorran footballer who plays for Spanish club UD Benabarre as a winger.

He made his international debut for the Andorra national football team in 2003.

References

External links

1986 births
Living people
People from Andorra la Vella
Andorran footballers
Andorra international footballers
Andorran expatriate footballers
Expatriate footballers in Spain
Association football forwards
UD Barbastro players